This is a list of cities in modern Sweden that once enjoyed city privileges, thus were entitled to call themselves town (plural städer). The year indicates the year they were established or when they were granted a royal charter. The list does not include towns in Finland established during Swedish rule.

Overview
Legally and administratively, the term stad is not used in Sweden since the municipal reform of 1971, when the municipality (kommun) became the only existing form of local government. Before the reform there were 132 urban centres (133 to 1966) that had the title of stad.

The urban centres of these municipalities are still called stad in daily speech and 14 of the municipalities have chosen to continue to call themselves stad in marketing situations, although several of them now encompass large rural areas following the merger of Swedish municipalities in the 1970s and 1980s. These 14 are: Borås Municipality, Gothenburg Municipality, Haparanda Municipality, Helsingborg Municipality, Landskrona Municipality, Lidingö Municipality, Malmö Municipality, Mölndal Municipality, Solna Municipality, Stockholm Municipality, Sundbyberg Municipality, Trollhättan Municipality, Vaxholm Municipality and Västerås Municipality.

The decision to call themselves stad has been taken purely for image and marketing reasons. In legal situations the word kommun (municipality) must be included in the municipality's name and governmental authorities will only refer to them by their legal names.

List

Notes 
 Skanör and Falsterbo were joined together administratively in 1754 by the name Skanör med Falsterbo; they merged into a single urban area in the 1960s, still keeping their separate identities as two towns.

Today 
Most of the former towns are today urban centres (tätorter) and seats of their municipalities. Two seats/former towns and municipalities have a different name: Djursholm is the seat of Danderyd Municipality and Visby is the seat of Gotland Municipality.

A number of suburban towns have grown together with neighbours and are nowadays seldom considered as separate towns: 
 Huskvarna (part of Jönköping)
 Mölndal (part of Gothenburg urban area)
 Djursholm, Nacka, Solna, Sundbyberg (part of Stockholm urban area)
 Lidingö (separated from Stockholm by water, but anyhow often counted to its urban area although according to Statistics Sweden, Lidingö is an urban area of its own)

The following are not seats of their municipalities:
 Gränna and Huskvarna (in Jönköping Municipality)
 Mariefred (in Strängnäs Municipality)
 Marstrand (in Kungälv Municipality)
 Sigtuna (in Sigtuna Municipality where the seat is Märsta)
 Skanör med Falsterbo (in Vellinge Municipality)
 Skänninge (in Mjölby Municipality)
 Torshälla (in Eskilstuna Municipality)
 Öregrund (in Östhammar Municipality)

See also 
Stad (Sweden)
Municipalities of Sweden
List of urban areas in Sweden by population
List of cities
List of cities in Europe

References

External links

Sweden
Cities
Sweden